National Heritage City Development and Augmentation Yojana (HRIDAY) was launched on 21 January 2015 with the aim of bringing together urban planning, economic growth and heritage conservation in an inclusive manner to preserve the heritage character of each Heritage City.

The Scheme shall support development of core heritage infrastructure projects including revitalization of linked urban infrastructure for heritage assets such as monuments, Ghats, temples etc. along with reviving certain intangible assets. These initiatives shall include development of sanitation facilities, roads, public transportation & parking, citizen services, information kiosks etc.

Objectives 
The objectives of the scheme are:

 Planning, development and implementation of heritage-sensitive infrastructure
 Service Delivery and infrastructure provisioning in the core areas of the historic city
 Preserve and revitalise heritage wherein tourists can connect directly with city’s unique character
 Develop and document a heritage asset inventory of cities – natural, cultural, living and built heritage as a basis for urban planning, growth, service provision and delivery
 Implementation and enhancement  of basic services delivery with focus on sanitation services like public conveniences, toilets, water taps, street lights, with use of latest technologies in improving tourist facilities/amenities.
 Local capacity enhancement for inclusive heritage-based industry

Funding
HRIDAY is a central sector scheme, where 100% funding will be provided by Government of India. INR 500 Crores have been allocated to the scheme, under the following heads: 

The scheme would be implemented in a mission mode. Each city has been granted a specific amount of fund, based on its population and size. The funding is as follows:

References

External links

Urban development in India
Urban renewal
2015 in India
Modi administration initiatives
Government schemes in India